Havana D'Primera is a Cuban Timba band founded by Alexander Abreu on October 4, 2007, the date on which they performed their first live performance, at the Cabaret Turquino of the Hotel Habana Libre in Havana. The band is made up of a collective of high-level musicians in the Cuban music scene with a total of 16 members.

Since their inception they have gone on to find international success, and even performed for Beyonce and Jay-Z when the couple visited Havana in 2013.

Lead singer and songwriter Alexander Abreu has received several awards for his artistic career: Best Timba Trumpeter in 2000 for the influential website www.timba.com and Best Folk Album for the album La Rumba Soy Yo, in the Latin Grammy Awards of 2001. In this album he participated as one of the main musicians.

Since its founding, the band has released five studio albums and one live album.

His first album Haciendo Historia  won the award for "Best Debut Album" at the 2010 Cubadisco gala.

His first release for the record label Páfata Productions, Pasaporte, received favorable reviews from the international press  and was voted one of the best Latin albums of the year by listeners of NPR. It was named by Los Angeles Times as one of the 10 Best Latin Music Albums of The time. In addition, it was awarded the award for "Best Popular Dance Music Album" at the 2013 Cubadisco Awards and won the award for "Best Choreographic Video" at the Lucas Awards 2012 with the video for the song Al Final de la Vida.

La Vuelta al Mundo won the awards for "Best Popular Dance Music Album" and "Grand Prize" at Cubadisco 2015, as well as "Best Popular Dance Music Video" at the Lucas Awards 2016 for the music video of the song Around the World. Likewise, the video for the song Me Dicen Cuba won a "Special Award" at the Lucas gala.

Cantor del Pueblo won the award for "Best Popular Dance Music Video" at the Lucas Awards 2019 and also secured a nomination for "Best Salsa Album" at the Latin Grammy Awards 2018.

The single Quiero Verte Otra Vez won the Special Prize at the Lucas Awards gala in 2020 and was also classified by the French newspaper “Le Monde” as one of the favorite songs of Latin music.

References

Musical groups established in 2008
Cuban musical groups